Germany is set to participate in the Eurovision Song Contest 2023 in Liverpool, United Kingdom, with "Blood & Glitter" performed by Lord of the Lost. The national final took place on 3 March 2023 and featured eight competing acts with the winner being selected through international jury voting and public voting.

Background 

Germany, to this point, has been noted for having competed in the contest more than any other country; they have competed in every contest since the first edition in 1956 except for the  when the nation was eliminated in a pre-contest elimination round. In , "Rockstars" performed by Malik Harris placed twenty-fifth (last) out of twenty-five competing songs with 6 points.

Before Eurovision

Unser Lied für Liverpool 

 (English: Our Song for Liverpool) was the competition that selected Germany's entry for the Eurovision Song Contest 2023. The competition took place on 3 March 2023 at the MMC Studios in Cologne, and was hosted by Barbara Schöneberger. The show was broadcast on Das Erste as well as online via the broadcaster's Eurovision Song Contest website eurovision.de and the ARD-Mediathek platform.

Competing entries 
Interested artists and composers were able to submit their entries for the competition between 9 November 2022 and 28 November 2022. Artists and composers were also able to upload their entries to TikTok with the hashtag #UnserLiedFürLiverpool. By the end of the process, it was announced that 548 submissions were received by NDR. The eight competing entries for the national final were selected over three stages. In the first stage, entries were shortlisted for the second stage by a panel consisting of members of the ARD Eurovision team and representatives of eurovision.de, ARD radio channels and the production company Bildergarten. The second stage involved an international expert panel that provided feedback in regards to the shortlisted entries for the ARD Eurovision team to select the eight entries in the third stage. The participating acts were announced on 27 January 2023. An additional six entries were selected by the ARD Eurovision team for a TikTok selection from over 900 submissions uploaded on the platform, with an online voing being held via TikTok app to determine the act advancing to the final, with the winner revealed during the broadcast of Alles Eurovision on 4 February. 

On 3 March, the band  withdrew their entry after their lead singer  fell ill. The group had already missed several rehearsals prior to their withdrawal.

Final 
The final took place on 3 March 2023. The winner was selected by a 50/50 combination of eight international jury groups from Switzerland, the Netherlands, Finland, Spain, Lithuania, Ukraine, Austria and the United Kingdom, as well as public voting. Each jury group distributed their points as follows: 1, 2, 3, 4, 6, 8, 10 and 12 points. The public vote was based on the percentage of votes each song achieved through the following voting methods: online, telephone, and SMS. For example, if a song gains 10% of the viewer vote, then that entry would be awarded 10% of 368 points rounded to the nearest integer: 37 points. The online voting window was open from 24 February to 3 March 2023, after which telephone and SMS voting were used during the show. Frida Gold had originally been scheduled to perform eighth prior to their withdrawal; their votes received during the online voting window were subsequently nullified, and Lord of the Lost, who was scheduled to perform after Frida Gold, retained their running order number. In addition to the performances of the competing entries, The BossHoss with Ilse DeLange, Florian Silbereisen, Riccardo Simonetti and 2022 German Eurovision entrant Malik Harris performed as interval acts.

At Eurovision 
According to Eurovision rules, all nations with the exceptions of the host country and the "Big Five" (France, Germany, Italy, Spain and the United Kingdom) are required to qualify from one of two semi-finals in order to compete in the final; the top ten countries from each semi-final progress to the final. As a member of the "Big Five", Germany automatically qualified to compete in the final on 13 May 2023. In addition to its participation in the final, Germany was also required to broadcast and vote in one of the two semi-finals. This was decided via a draw held during the semi-final allocation draw on 31 January 2023, when it was announced that Germany would be voting in the first semi-final.

References 

2023
Countries in the Eurovision Song Contest 2023
Eurovision
Eurovision